Trinity United Methodist Church is a property in Franklin, Tennessee that was listed on the National Register of Historic Places in 1988.  It dates from 1897.  It was built by Stewart Ironworks.

The NRHP eligibility of this and other properties was covered in a 1988 study of Williamson County historical resources.

Beliefs 
The Trinity Methodist church believes that the Bible is the inspired word of God (Jesus). And that  the church is the body of Christ, formed by the holy spirit to assist each person as they grow. (see official website and go to What we believe for a full

References

External links
 

Churches on the National Register of Historic Places in Tennessee
Churches in Williamson County, Tennessee
Romanesque Revival church buildings in Tennessee
Churches completed in 1897
United Methodist churches in Tennessee
Buildings and structures in Franklin, Tennessee
National Register of Historic Places in Williamson County, Tennessee